Kabaad: The Coin is a 2021 Indian Hindi-language film, starring Vivaan Shah, Zoya Afroz and Atul Srivastav. The film is produced by Babban Negi and Meena Negi and directed by Varadraj Swami. Written by Shahzad Ahmed and Varadraj Swami, the film is scheduled to release on 17 May 2021 on the Over-the-top media service MX Player.

Cast
 Vivaan Shah as Bandhan
 Zoya Afroz as Roma
 Atul Srivastav as Vaghmare
 Abhishek Bajaj as Sam 
 Imran Hasnee  as Badshah Khan 
 Bhagwan Tiwari as inspector Lokhande 
 Abhimanyu pandey as a police man
 Yashashri Masurkar as Savita
 Shahzad Ahmed as Gajni

References

External links
 Kabaad: The Coin at Filmibeat
 Kabaad: The Coin at Cinestaan
 Kabaad: The Coin at Koimoi

2021 films
Hindi-language drama films
Indian drama films